Camilla Helene Hallås Farestveit (born 5 December 1989) is a Norwegian speed skater. She competed for the Norwegian team in the women's team pursuit at the 2014 Winter Olympics. Farestveit was born in Bergen.

References

External links 
 

1989 births
Living people
Sportspeople from Bergen
Norwegian female speed skaters
Olympic speed skaters of Norway
Speed skaters at the 2014 Winter Olympics